Benedikt "Ben" Aage Munk (December 3, 1929 – March 13, 2009) was professor of electrical engineering at the ElectroScience Laboratory (ESL) at The Ohio State University (OSU), Columbus, Ohio, US.

Munk is best known for his contributions to the field of applied electromagnetic, especially periodic surfaces (also known as metasurfaces) and antenna arrays. He is the author of many papers on periodic surfaces and antennas, as well as two key books. The most significant work are the "Finite Antenna Arrays and FSS" in which he discusses the design of the ultra wide band tightly coupled dipole antenna array and "Frequency Selective Surfaces: Theory and Design". Unlike other antenna books that heavily emphasize theory and mathematics, Munk's approach is based on intuitive understanding and engineering aspects of the subjects. He had contributed two chapters to the third edition of John Kraus' classic book, "Antennas for All Applications", published in 2002. His last book publication is named "Metamaterials: Critique and Alternatives" which was published in 2009 by Wiley. In this books he argues against negative permittivity/permeability meta-materials and cloaking. 

Munk received a master's degree in electrical engineering from the Technical University of Denmark and a PhD in electrical engineering from The Ohio State University (OSU) in 1954 and 1968, respectively. He joined the ElectroScience Laboratory in 1964, where he was a professor and later, professor emeritus, until he died.

Prior to joining ESL, Munk was a chief designer for A/S Nordisk Antenne Fabrik, Denmark, and an assistant group leader in the antenna section of Rohde and Schwarz in Munich, Germany. Later, he was a research and development engineer with the Andrew Corporation, Chicago, Illinois, and then an antenna researcher with Rockwell International in Columbus, Ohio.

Munk died on Friday, March 13, 2009, at Arlington Court Nursing Home, Columbus, Ohio. He was 79.

References

1929 births
2009 deaths
American electrical engineers
Ohio State University College of Engineering alumni
Ohio State University faculty
20th-century American engineers
Microwave engineers